In enzymology, a piperidine N-piperoyltransferase is an enzyme that catalyzes the chemical reaction

(E,E)-piperoyl-CoA + piperidine  CoA + N-[(E,E)-piperoyl]-piperidine

Thus, the two substrates of this enzyme are (E,E)-piperoyl-CoA and piperidine, whereas its two products are CoA and [[N-[(E,E)-piperoyl]-piperidine]].

This enzyme belongs to the family of transferases, specifically those acyltransferases transferring groups other than aminoacyl groups.  The systematic name of this enzyme class is (E,E)-piperoyl-CoA:piperidine N-piperoyltransferase. Other names in common use include piperidine piperoyltransferase, and piperoyl-CoA:piperidine N-piperoyltransferase.

References

 

EC 2.3.1
Enzymes of unknown structure